The 1933 Virginia gubernatorial election was held on November 7, 1933 to elect the governor of Virginia.

Results

References

1933
Virginia
gubernatorial
November 1933 events in the United States